Koen Schockaert (born 13 February 1978) is a retired Belgian football striker.

References

1978 births
Living people
Belgian footballers
K.S.C. Lokeren Oost-Vlaanderen players
Club Brugge KV players
Sint-Truidense V.V. players
Beerschot A.C. players
F.C.V. Dender E.H. players
Royal Cappellen F.C. players
Belgian expatriate footballers
Expatriate footballers in Norway
Belgian expatriate sportspeople in Norway
Tromsø IL players
Eliteserien players

Association football forwards
Sportkring Sint-Niklaas players